Lissa was a town of ancient Lycia, mentioned by Ptolemy.

Its site is located near Kızılağaç, Asiatic Turkey. Inscriptions and tombs have been found at the site.

References

Populated places in ancient Lycia
Former populated places in Turkey
Archaeological sites in Turkey